Michael Stuart Ani is an American writer, musician and explorer notable for residing with the Yanomami people of the Amazon rainforest in the 1980s.

Career
He co-founded the Amazonia Foundation in 1991 and has collaborated with several anthropologists, most notably Napoleon Chagnon.

In the 1990s, Ani worked with Paula Abdul as a co-producer on several tracks for her album Head Over Heels.

References

External links
 
 Amazonia Foundation website

Year of birth missing (living people)
Living people
American explorers